Marasmarcha iranica is a moth of the family Pterophoridae. It is found in Iran.

The wingspan is 20–24 mm.

References

Moths described in 1999
Exelastini
Moths of the Middle East